Dead at Daybreak is the second crime novel written by South African thriller novelist, Deon Meyer. Its Afrikaans title is Orion, and it has been translated into English by Madeleine van Biljon.

In this bestselling thriller, the author brings together history, that of the apartheid system, and politics, that of South Africa in Angola.

This book won a coveted international prize, the France’s Prix Mystère de la critique. It has also been the basis of Orion, a series for television.

Plot summary 
Zatopek 'Zet' van Heerden, an Afrikaner former cop, is private detective. He is appointed by the lawyer Hope Beneke to find in less than 7 days a testament bequeathing to the widow Wilna van As the fortune of her husband, Johannes Jacobus Smit. This rich antiquarian was tortured at their home and murdered after the opening of his safe-deposit box and the stealing of its content. van Heerden discovers that "J. J. Smit" was not the person whose papers he carried, and that someone wants to hide his true identity.

The plot alternates between the chapters written in the third person and describing the step-by-step investigations, and those written in the first person and detailing the history of the personal life of Zet van Heerden. This character is like a vindicator showing us that no one holds a single truth, and that coexistence with former enemies is difficult.

In parallel, the reader discovers the life of Thobela Mpayipheli, a member of Umkhonto we Sizwe — the armed wing of African National Congress — sent to the former Soviet Union and East Germany to be trained as an assassin.

Quotation 
In a dialogue with Hope (Beneke), a sentence summarizes how between Zet (van Heerden), the main character, oscillates between positive and negative feelings.
'My mother is an artist. That's her work.' He pointed to the wall. 'She creates beautiful paintings. She looks at the world and she makes it more beautiful on canvas. I think it's her way of distancing herself from the evil that is in all of us.' (Day 4 — Sunday, 9 July).

References

External links 
 Deon Meyer official website

1998 novels
Detective novels
Novels about murder
20th-century South African novels